Mizgin is a feminine given  name of Kurdish language origin, meaning good news.

Mizgin (born 1991), stage name of Swedish singer and songwriter Mizgin Demircan,
Mizgin Ay (born 2000), Turkish sprinter

References